Climacoptera is a genus of flowering plants belonging to the family Amaranthaceae.

Its native range is Temperate Asia.

Species:

Climacoptera afghanica 
Climacoptera amblyostegia 
Climacoptera aralensis 
Climacoptera botschantzevii 
Climacoptera bucharica 
Climacoptera canescens 
Climacoptera chorassanica 
Climacoptera crassa 
Climacoptera czelekenica 
Climacoptera ferganica 
Climacoptera intricata 
Climacoptera iranica 
Climacoptera iraqensis 
Climacoptera kasakorum 
Climacoptera khalisica 
Climacoptera korshinskyi 
Climacoptera lachnophylla 
Climacoptera lanata 
Climacoptera longipistillata 
Climacoptera longistylosa 
Climacoptera maimanica 
Climacoptera malyginii 
Climacoptera merkulowiczii 
Climacoptera minkvitziae 
Climacoptera narynensis 
Climacoptera obtusifolia 
Climacoptera olgae 
Climacoptera oxyphylla 
Climacoptera pjataevae 
Climacoptera ptiloptera 
Climacoptera subcrassa 
Climacoptera sukaczevii 
Climacoptera susamyrica 
Climacoptera transoxana 
Climacoptera turcomanica 
Climacoptera turgaica 
Climacoptera tyshchenkoi 
Climacoptera ustjurtensis 
Climacoptera vachschi 
Climacoptera zenobiae

References

Amaranthaceae
Amaranthaceae genera
Taxa named by Victor Botchantsev